Peng Xinli (born 22 July 1991 in Chengdu) is a Chinese professional footballer who currently plays as a left-footed midfielder for Chinese Super League club Shanghai Shenhua.

Club career
Peng Xinli was considered a technically gifted player as a youngster and was sent out to Ligue 2 side FC Metz by the Chengdu Football Association to study and practice abroad for two months. When he returned to China, he would join Chengdu Blades and go on to make his senior debut in a league game against Shandong Luneng on 28 June 2008 in a 2-1 defeat. Under then manager Li Bing, he was viewed as a promising youngster and would often come on as a substitute throughout the 2008 league season until he was given his first start against Shenzhen Xiangxue on 25 October 2008 in a 3-1 victory. For the next several seasons he was used sparingly until in 2011 Chinese Super League season he established himself as an integral member of the team scoring three goals in 27 appearances, however despite this it wasn't enough to keep Chengdu within the top tier.  

Peng transferred to Guangzhou Evergrande on 26 December 2011 along with Zhao Xuri, Li Jianbin, and Rong Hao. He would make his debut for the club on 18 July 2012 in a Chinese FA Cup game against Henan Jianye F.C. in a 2-1 victory. Within the league, Peng would not make his debut until the last game of the season against Beijing Guoan F.C. on 3 November 2012 in a 1-0 defeat, despite the defeat Guangzhou Evergrande had already won the 2012 Chinese Super League. The following season Peng would continue to struggle to establish himself within the team, however he would scored his first and second goal for the club in the 2013 Chinese FA Cup in which Guangzhou beat China League Two side Dali Ruilong 7-1 on 10 July 2013 a day before he was loaned back to Chengdu.

On 11 February 2015, Peng was loaned to fellow Chinese Super League side Chongqing Lifan until 31 December 2015. He would make his debut for the club on 8 March 2015 in a league game against Beijing Guoan F.C. that ended in a 3-0 defeat. On 19 February 2016, Chongqing extended his loan deal for another season. This was followed by his first goal for the club in a league game against 	Hangzhou Greentown in a 1-1 draw. He made a permanent transfer to Chongqing Lifan in February 2017. 

On 24 July 2019, Peng joined fellow Chinese Super League side Shanghai Shenhua. He would make his debut in a league game against Guangzhou R&F F.C. on 27 July 2019 that ended in a 5-3 victory. Peng would go on to establish himself as an integral part of the team and go on to win the 2019 Chinese FA Cup with them in his debut season.

International career
Peng was called up to the Chinese under-20 national team in 2009. He also took part in the 2010 AFC U-19 Championship qualification, playing in most of China's matches. He made his debut for Chinese national team on 26 March 2018 in a 4–1 loss against Czech Republic in 2018 China Cup, coming on as a substitution for Fan Xiaodong in the 72nd minute.

Career statistics

Club statistics
Statistics accurate as of match played 28 December 2021.

International statistics

Honours

Club
Guangzhou Evergrande
Chinese Super League: 2012, 2013
Chinese FA Cup: 2012, 2013

Shanghai Shenhua
Chinese FA Cup: 2019

References

External links
 
 
Player stats at Sohu.com

1991 births
Living people
Sportspeople from Chengdu
Chinese footballers
China international footballers
Footballers from Sichuan
Chengdu Tiancheng F.C. players
Guangzhou F.C. players
Meizhou Hakka F.C. players
Chongqing Liangjiang Athletic F.C. players
Shanghai Shenhua F.C. players
Chinese Super League players
China League One players
China League Two players
Association football midfielders
21st-century Chinese people